Surrey was a provincial electoral district in the Canadian province of British Columbia from 1966 to 1983.  The area it covered was formerly part of the electoral district of Delta.  It returned one member to the Legislative Assembly of B.C. from 1966 to 1975 and two members thereafter. It was abolished prior to the 1986 election into Surrey-Guildford-Whalley, Surrey-Newton and Surrey-White Rock-Cloverdale.  

For other historical and current ridings in Vancouver or the North Shore see Vancouver (electoral districts).  For other Greater Vancouver area ridings please see New Westminster (electoral districts).

Demographics

Political geography

Notable elections

Notable MLAs 
Bill Vander Zalm
Rita Johnston

Electoral history 

 
|Liberal
|Renaldo Angelo Masi
|align="right"|1,234 	
|align="right"|8.45%
|align="right"|
|align="right"|unknown

|- bgcolor="white"
!align="right" colspan=3|Total valid votes
!align="right"|14,604
!align="right"|100.00%
!align="right"|
|- bgcolor="white"
!align="right" colspan=3|Total rejected ballots
!align="right"|119
!align="right"|
!align="right"|
|- bgcolor="white"
!align="right" colspan=3|Turnout
!align="right"|%
!align="right"|
!align="right"|
|}

 
|New Democrat
|Ernest Hall
|align="right"|9,398 		 	
|align="right"|47.23%
|align="right"|
|align="right"|unknown

 
|Liberal
|Robert Jacobs
|align="right"|1,581 	 	
|align="right"|7.94%
|align="right"|
|align="right"|unknown
|- bgcolor="white"
!align="right" colspan=3|Total valid votes
!align="right"|19,900 	
!align="right"|100.00%
!align="right"|
|- bgcolor="white"
!align="right" colspan=3|Total rejected ballots
!align="right"|223
!align="right"|
!align="right"|
|- bgcolor="white"
!align="right" colspan=3|Turnout
!align="right"|%
!align="right"|
!align="right"|
|}

 
|Liberal
|William Nick (Bill) Vander Zalm
|align="right"|3,995 	 	
|align="right"|16.68%
|align="right"|
|align="right"|unknown
 
|Progressive Conservative
|William Earl (Bill) Reid
|align="right"|1,415 	 			
|align="right"|5.91%
|align="right"|
|align="right"|unknown

|- bgcolor="white"
!align="right" colspan=3|Total valid votes
!align="right"|23,956 	
!align="right"|100.00%
!align="right"|
|- bgcolor="white"
!align="right" colspan=3|Total rejected ballots
!align="right"|395
!align="right"|
!align="right"|
|- bgcolor="white"
!align="right" colspan=3|Turnout
!align="right"|%
!align="right"|
!align="right"|
|}

 
|Liberal
|Donald Alvin Ross
|align="right"|1,257 	 	 	 	
|align="right"|4.68%
|align="right"|
|align="right"|unknown

|- bgcolor="white"
!align="right" colspan=3|Total valid votes
!align="right"|26,879 		
!align="right"|100.00%
!align="right"|
|- bgcolor="white"
!align="right" colspan=3|Total rejected ballots
!align="right"|386
!align="right"|
!align="right"|
|- bgcolor="white"
!align="right" colspan=3|Turnout
!align="right"|%
!align="right"|
!align="right"|
|}

 
|Progressive Conservative
|Brian Kent Westwood
|align="right"|5,834 		
|align="right"|4.89%
|align="right"|
|align="right"|unknown

|- bgcolor="white"
!align="right" colspan=3|Total valid votes
!align="right"|119,361 		 	
!align="right"|100.00%
!align="right"|
|- bgcolor="white"
!align="right" colspan=3|Total rejected ballots
!align="right"|1,368
!align="right"|
!align="right"|
|- bgcolor="white"
!align="right" colspan=3|Turnout
!align="right"|%
!align="right"|
!align="right"|
|- bgcolor="white"
!align="right" colspan=7|1   Seat increased to two members from one.
|}

 
|Progressive Conservative
|Frank Nelson Wright
|align="right"|2,531 	
|align="right"|1.68%
|align="right"|
|align="right"|unknown
 
|Liberal
|Judith E. Higginbotham
|align="right"|1,673 	 	 		 	
|align="right"|1.11%
|align="right"|
|align="right"|unknown
 
|Liberal
|Donald Peter McKinnon
|align="right"|1,651 	 	 		 	
|align="right"|1.09%
|align="right"|
|align="right"|unknown

|- bgcolor="white"
!align="right" colspan=3|Total valid votes
!align="right"|150,894 	 
!align="right"|100.00%
!align="right"|
|- bgcolor="white"
!align="right" colspan=3|Total rejected ballots
!align="right"|1,018
!align="right"|
!align="right"|
|- bgcolor="white"
!align="right" colspan=3|Turnout
!align="right"|%
!align="right"|
!align="right"|
|}

The riding was reconstituted into three ridings for the 1986 election: Surrey-Newton, Surrey-Guildford-Whalley and Surrey-White Rock-Cloverdale.  These were later reconstituted into the following ridings:

Surrey-Newton
Surrey-Panorama Ridge
Surrey-Tynehead
Surrey-Guildford-Whalley
Surrey-Green Timbers
Surrey-Whalley
Surrey-White Rock-Cloverdale
Surrey-White Rock
Surrey-Cloverdale

Sources 
 Elections BC Historical Returns

Former provincial electoral districts of British Columbia
Politics of Surrey, British Columbia